Axiom Telecom was founded by an Emirati entrepreneur, Faisal Al Bannai, with four employees at the start of its operations in 1997. Axiom became the official distributors for mobile consumer brands in the UAE and Saudi Arabia, including Samsung, Apple, LG, HTC, Huawei, Nokia, BlackBerry, and the largest market share in the Middle East.

History
In 2001, Axiom grew rapidly and introduced its first retail outlet in the UAE.

In 2003, Axiom started its regional roll-out, and has since established presence in Kuwait, Bahrain, Qatar, Oman, Saudi Arabia (2004), Egypt (2007), London in 2007 and India (2007).

In December 2005, TECOM Group, a member of Dubai Holding, acquired a 40 percent share of the Axiom Telecom.

Today Axiom owns and operates stores through partner arrangements in the UAE with Spinneys and Union Co-op outlets. Axiom is also the exclusive telecom partner for Adnoc, Emarat, Enoc & Eppco petrol stations where mobile phone accessories are sold in over 350 locations.

In June 2011 Dubai Holding sold 14% of Axiom Telecom.

In 2013, 2014 and 2016, Axiom Telecom applied for an MVNO license to operate in Saudi Arabia.

During 2019, Axiom Telecom announced the organisation had commissioned architecture firm MMA projects to construct a new headquarters in Dubai's silicon oasis. The 34.000 sqm headquarters has been constructed using cement, black glass, and cor-ten and is separated into three main blocks, a main area containing a gym, restaurant and lounge, a central area for operational and managerial activity and its production and logistics operations area.

In March 2023, Sam Hoffpauir was hired as Chief Technology Officer.

Profile
Axiom Telecom is a telecom retailer in the Middle East. The company's operations merge wholesale, retail, value added services (games, ring-tones, data backup, etc.) and after-sales care of wireless communications devices.

Axiom carries mobile telecommunications devices such as Nokia, Honor, Sony Ericsson, Motorola, Samsung and Huawei. Axiom Telecom was appointed in 2010 as the distributor for Blackberry products across the Middle East.

Axiom Telecom operates in India under a joint venture with Future Group as Future Axiom Ltd where it operates about 350 retail outlets.

Axiom Service Provider is an airtime service provider for the Thuraya Satellite Company. It has service agreements with international telecommunications operations. Axiom service provider is the only national service provider for Thuraya in Iraq.

References

External links
 

Mobile phone companies of the United Arab Emirates
Telecommunications companies established in 1996